Aznab-e Olya (also Romanized as Aznāb-e ‘Olyā) is a village in Kanduleh Rural District, Dinavar District, Sahneh County, Kermanshah Province, Iran. At the 2006 census, its population was 80, in 19 families.

References 

Populated places in Sahneh County